Club Atlético San Miguel is an Argentine sports club from San Miguel, Buenos Aires The club's headquarters are located in San Miguel while its football stadium is erected in Los Polvorines district of Malvinas Argentinas Partido. Although many sports are practised at the club, San Miguel is mostly known for its football team, which currently plays in Primera B, the third division of the Argentine football league system.

Apart from football, other sports hosted by San Miguel are basketball, boxing, field hockey, martial arts, roller skating, swimming, tennis and volleyball.

History

The institution was established on 7 August 1922 as "Club Independiente San Miguel", while it was decided that the colors of the jersey would be green and white.

In 1930 the club merged to Club Germinal of Villa Lynch, but the fusion was dissolved a year later and the club changed its name to current "Club Atlético San Miguel". Five years later the club acquired the land where headquarters are currently located.

In 1977 San Miguel acquired a land in Los Polvorines district of Greater Buenos Aires, where the club built a multi-sports field (which would be inaugurated on 3 September 1978 with a friendly match against Sportivo Italiano). That same year San Miguel affiliated to Argentine Football Association, debuting in the Primera D tournament.

The club won its first title in 1979, promoting to Primera C, then the third division of Argentine league system. After spending some seasons in Primera C, San Miguel won another title in 1984 promoting to Primera B. Journalists Juan Carlutti and Gastón Asiari nicknamed the team "El Trueno Verde" (The Green Thunder) during its first year in the second division due to the great campaign made by the squad. The coach was Rubén Glaria.

Titles
Primera B Metropolitana (1): 1996–97
Primera C Metropolitana (2): 1984, 2016–17
Primera D Metropolitana (1): 1979

External links

 
 Official site (archived, 9 Jan 2013)
 Trueno Verde (fan site) 

San Miguel
San Miguel
San Miguel Partido
1922 establishments in Argentina